Atlantis (sometimes called the Kingdom of Atlantis or the Atlantean Empire) is an aquatic civilization appearing in American comic books published by DC Comics commonly associated with the superhero, Aquaman. It is one of the numerous depictions of Atlantis within DC Comics and is, perhaps, the most recognizable depiction within DC Comics. The version of the city first appeared in Adventure Comics #260 (May 1959), and was created by Robert Bernstein and Ramona Fradon.

An aquatic nation whose people are human-like creatures with varying levels of biological, aquatic adaptations, Atlantis is considered within DC Universe one of the first and oldest civilizations in the history of the Earth as well as one of the most powerful. In most continuities and stories, Atlantis is a hereditary monarchy that was founded by a powerful race of magic users known as the Homo magi (sometimes referred to as ancient Atlanteans or Atlanteans) and over the course of its history, became an epicenter of magic and science alike. Eventually, the nation would collapse into the bottom of the ocean and its people would adapt and evolved into the modern, aquatic Atlanteans. Overtime, the nation's history would be embordered in conflict with regards to its succession of rulers, the nation's status as a superpower, its fictional cultural heritage, and its relationship with the global world in the modern age.

The Kingdom of Atlantis made its cinematic debut in the 2017 film Justice League, set in the DC Extended Universe, and was later more prominently featured in the 2018 film Aquaman.

Publication history
While Golden Age of Comics version of Atlantis exists, the version in the "Aquaman" tales first appeared in Adventure Comics #260, in a story by writer Robert Bernstein and artist Ramona Fradon.

The history of Atlantis was detailed in The Atlantis Chronicles, a 7-issue miniseries published by DC Comics from March 1990 through September 1990. It was written by Peter David, and illustrated by Esteban Maroto. The series focused on a series of Atlantean historical manuscripts, also called The Atlantis Chronicles, and chronicled the rise and fall of Atlantis. Each issue dealt with a separate era or event in Atlantis' past, beginning with its sinking, as told through the royal historian's point of view.

Fictional history

The continent of Atlantis was settled 65,000,000 years ago, by a humanoid extraterrestrial race known as the Hunter/Gatherers, who proceeded to hunt the animals to extinction. One million years ago, Atlantean society flourished alongside Homo erectus, the precursors of modern man. This apparently occurred long before the intervention of the genetic tampering with the Metagene.

Thousands of years ago, magic levels on Earth began to drop due to the sleeping entity known as Darkworld beginning to awaken. The Atlantean sorceress, Citrina, struck a deal with the Lords of Chaos who ruled Gemworld, so she would be allowed to create a home there for those Homo magi and magic dependent species such as the Faerie, Elves, Centaurs, and so forth who wished to emigrate from Earth. Gemworld was colonized by Homo magi emigrants from Earth made up of the 12 ruling houses of Atlantis.

Darkworld was a dimension formed by the body of an unnamed cosmic entity who later fell into a deep sleep. This entity's dreams were responsible for creating the first Lords of Chaos and Order, Chaon (chaos), Gemimn (order), and Tynan the Balancer. These beings and others were worshiped as gods by the citizens of Atlantis. Darkworld was tethered to Atlantis by a massive "chain" created by Deedra, goddess of nature. Some Atlantean magicians such as Arion and Garn Daanuth later learned to tap the mystic energies of Darkworld, enabling them to wield nearly godlike power.

Eventually, Atlantis came to be the center of early human civilization. Its king, Orin, ordered the construction of a protective dome over the city simply as a defense against barbarian tribes, but shortly afterward a meteor crashed into the earth, destroying most of the upper world and sinking the city to the bottom of the ocean. Orin's brother, Shalako, departed with a number of followers through tunnels in order to reclaim another sunken city of their empire, Tritonis, whose inhabitants had not survived. After a few years, Atlantean scientists developed a serum that would permanently let their people breathe underwater; as a consequence of the magic used by Shalako in settling Tritonis, the Tritonians were further mutated to have fish-tails instead of legs. Some descendants of Shalako's son Dardanus also inherited his telepathy, which was marked by blonde hair, extremely rare among Atlanteans. Dardanus's son Kordax further had the ability to command sea creatures. After he led them alongside the Tritonians in a revolution against the king, he was exiled, and children born with blond hair, the "mark of Kordax" were generally viewed as aberrations and abandoned to die.

Notable locations

Major Cities and areas 
 College of the Silent School - A notable Atlantean guild that acts as a school, teaching magic to Atlantean magicians. Considered the most prestigious Atlantean school of magic, it is led by a headmaster that acts as a government official (Elder) over magical activities in Atlantis and protects the kingdom from magical-related threats. The school is also considered one of the most secure places on Earth. The hero known as Tempest was once a student of the Silent School.
 Ninth Tride of Atlantis - A district in Atlantis consisting of outcasts, dissidents, gangs, and mutants. The Ninth Tride is considered the poorest district and one of the few areas of Atlantis not inherently loyal to the monarch ruler and their cabinet. The area serves as the hometown of Aquaman villain, Corum Rath. The Aquaman villain, King Shark, once ruled over the Ninth Tride of Atlantis as a crime boss.
 Poseidonis - The capital of Atlantis named after the Greek God of the Ocean, Poseidon. It serves as Aquaman's main base of operations and is the administrative center of Atlantis. 
 City of the Golden Gate - The former capital of ancient Atlantis long before it sunk. Like its successor Poseidonis, the city once served as the administrative center of ancient Atlantis and is named after the city's golden-like appearance as well as having a gate notable for fending off invaders. The Golden Gate City would serve as the main base of operations and setting in several story arcs of the Arion, Lord of Atlantis series.

The Seven Kingdoms 
After the New 52 reboot, Atlantis is considered one of the seven major kingdoms with others affiliated with it, each kingdom existing as a major super-power in their own right. While the New 52 initially only introduced four of the seven kingdoms, DC Rebirth would later introduce three more.

Kingdom of Xebel 
Originally, Xebel was an other dimensional kingdom formerly ruled by Queen Mera until she was deposed and was ruled by her nemesis, Queen V'lana. Mera's twin sister Hila also stayed behind in Xebel. The Aquaman villain known as Thanatos also originated from there. The kingdom of Xebel is located within "Dimension Aqua".

Later revisions to its history reveals Xebel to be forgotten extradimensional penal colony for an ancient group of separatist Atlanteans, locked behind a sealed portal in the Bermuda Triangle. In modern continuities, Xebel is typically under the leadership of Nereus. While similar to Atlantis in political structure, Xebel has a more strict martial code, favors masculine rulership, and political dilemmas are often settled through physical combat. Considered a formidable kingdom, Xebel has less resources than Atlantis due to being sealed behind a portal, forcing the population to gather materials through unlikely shipwrecks in the Bermuda Triangle.

Kingdom of The Trench 
Located in the Marina Trench, the kingdom is home to a race of viscous, cannibalistic ocean-dwelling creatures with a fish-like humanoid appearance. Initially, the Trench were characterized as being hostile to all other ocean dwelling races, including Atlanteans. Later, it was revealed that the Trench was once a kingdom, a fact previously unknown. Overtime, the Trench is later seen to be in more neutral terms with the others kingdoms. The Trench Kingdom is ruled by the Trench Queen.

Kingdom of the Deserters 
A hidden kingdom in the Sahara Desert, it is the last kingdom to be accepted prior to the sinking of Atlantis from Atlan shortly after the end of his reign. The kingdom was known for its metallurgy and the use of rare, mystical metals such as Nth metal and orichalcum, metals with enhanced durability and mystical properties. The Kingdom's inhabits originated from Africa and during Atlan's reign, the Deserters would return to their homeland along with most of their technology weeks before Atlan would sink the continent. Due to this, the Deserters population did not become the biological adapted to the sea like others, remaining human/homo magi. Eventually, the Deserters themselves dissolved though their descendants still passed their technology. Descendants of the Deserters tribe would include mystic sorcerer Doctor Mist, Aquaman's archenemy Black Manta, alongside the paternal line of his family, Jackson Hyde, and Aquaman villain Devil Ray.

Kingdom of the Brine 
A kingdom of bulky, anthropomorphic crustaceans. Originally, the Brine was introduced in the Aquaman 2018 film prior to being brought to the comics.

Kingdom of the Wrights 
A kingdom consisting of humanoid rodents with the ability to breathe underwater.

Kingdom of the Sea Lights 
A Kingdom consisting of green haired, bioluminescent humanoids with the ability to breathe underwater.

Atlantis's City-States

Mu 
In DC Comics, Mu is one of Atlantis's former city-states and a major location in the Arion, Lord of Atlantis series. The city was once ruled by the titular character's estranged family members, Garn Daanuth and Dark Majistra, the former using force in order to suppress and supersede the rulership of his successors after a political movement caused Atlantis to use science instead of magic and replaced its sorcerous rulers. The inhabitant's culture, appearances, and architecture would resemble ancient Egyptians. The city would eventually fall into decay during Garn's rulership as he sought to invade the City of the Golden Gate and rule the entire kingdom of Atlantis and fell into antiquity.

Lemuria 
In DC Comics, the Lemurians are a scientifically advanced race of blue-skinned humanoids covered in part with large green scales. They live in the underwater city of Lemuria, based on the fictional continent of the same name. Zanadu the Chaos Master professed to be a sorcerer from Lemuria.

Venturia and Aurania 
Queen of a crumbling Atlantean outpost named Venturia, a subsea realm situated somewhere beneath the bottom of the Atlantic Ocean (Comics Cavalcade #18, December/January 1946/1947: "The Menace of the Rebel Manlings" until she is deposed by Wonder Woman in Spring 1944), Queen Clea enslaved the men of her realm and amused herself by putting many to death in gladiatorial combat. Desiring extended rule, Clea repeatedly attacked Venturia's flourishing sister city of Aurania unsuccessfully. Despite this failure she expanded her ideal towards domination over the entire lost continent of Atlantis. In order to do this, Clea stole the fabled Trident of Poseidon to make herself virtually unstoppable.

Sub Diego 
Sub Diego is the new name of a portion of the city of San Diego, California which was submerged during an artificially generated earthquake, part of a plan which changed part of the surviving population into sub-aquatic beings. The city had a recent increase in population due to an influx of refugees from Atlantis, following the destruction of that city by the Spectre. Roughly 50 weeks after the Infinite Crisis, an unknown event caused part of the Sub Diego population to be changed back into air-breathers. Thus, Aquaman had to use magic to make a huge part of the city return on the surface, joined to the rest of San Diego. It is still unknown how much of Sub Diego stayed submerged.

Dagon 
A kingdom recently founded by the formerly ousted Atlantean king, Ocean Master. The kingdom primarily consisted of refugees and migrants from Atlantis's Ninth Tride, an area of Atlantis considered the poorest district. The population of Dagon, save Ocean Master, consists of Atlantean "mutants" (Atlanteans with a more fish-like appearance and sometimes additional abilities compared to baseline Atlanteans). While Ocean Master would steer the population against the mainline Atlantis kingdom with intent in making it the eventual new capital and to politically secure a place on the throne once more, he is eventually forced to relinquish his hold after his crimes against Mera (kidnapping her child with Aquaman, Andrina Curry) were made publicly known and Aquaman's triumph in combat with Orm causing Dagon to become a democracy. Dagon would also formally join Atlantis as one of its official city-states.

Homo magi
In the DC Universe, the Homo magi originated on the lost continent of Atlantis. The continent was a focal point for unharnessed magical energies (wild magic), and the local Homo sapiens evolved into Homo magi as a result of their exposure to these energies. Upon the fall of Atlantis, people who carried the predisposition for magic were scattered to the four winds. Today, every human being capable of casting spells is a descendant of the Atlantean Homo magi.

In other media

Television
 Atlantis appears in the TV shows that are part of the DCAU:
 In Superman: The Animated Series, Atlantis was hidden for centuries until Aquaman came up to confront Lex Luthor after a recent LuthorCorp underseas construction project.
 It is also featured in Justice League, where the League helped Aquaman deal with an attempted coup by Orm.
 In the Powerless episode "Sinking Day", Van Wayne and Emily Locke managed to close a deal with the Lost City of Atlantis to supply them with security solutions after Wayne Security loses their contract with Ace Chemicals.
 Atlantis is featured in The Flash. On Earth-1, it is a lost city. On Earth-2, it is above the water and is a play that nobody wants to leave. In the episode "The Darkness and the Light", Hunter Zolomon loves Atlantis and makes a reference to an unidentified friend of his that lives there. In "Welcome to Earth-2", the Barry Allen of Earth-2 was able to arrange for his parents to go to Atlantis on their anniversary. In "Escape from Earth-2", the Barry Allen of Earth-2 and his Iris West relocated to Atlantis after Flash freed Barry Allen of Earth-2 and Jesse Quick from Zoom. In "Death of the Speed Force" taking place sometime after "Crisis on Infinite Earths" and the formation of Earth-Prime, Atlantis is on Earth-Prime as Cisco Ramon mentions that he visited it. In "Pay the Piper", Cisco mentions that he noticed a component on Atlantis that might help to form a perpetual motion machine.
 Atlantis is featured throughout the series Young Justice with a history specific to the show's Earth-16:
 Atlantis began as a tribe once led by Vandal Savage where he and his metahuman offspring lived in harmony. Following an assault by a lord of chaos, the tribe and its inhabitants, save for Savage, were destroyed. 
 Years later Atlantis rose again ruled by Vandal's grandson, Arion. Arion was later bequeathed a crown from the lords of order and with it birthed the ancestors of the worlds Homo magi. Atlantis became an advanced metropolis bustling with both Homo magi and Metahumans. Upon returning to Atlantis, Savage suggested that his grandson sink the city to further Atlantean evolution. Realizing the potential casualties, Arion objected to the idea. Savage, however, remembered that he had a thousand-year contract with Klarion the Witch Boy, the lord of chaos who had previously decimated Atlantis, that was due to be fulfilled soon. Vandal used his agreement with Klarion to sink the continent of Atlantis, allowing Klarion to ring chaos upon the earth. The sinking killed thousands but unlocked the metagenes of the Homo magi of Atlantis, allowing the Atlanteans to begin an orderly rule over the depths of the sea.
 In the present day, it is revealed King Arion had survived his apparent death when Atlantis fell. He returned to the Atlantic capital of Poseidonis to thwart Ocean Master and purge the chaotic red magic poisoning the sea. In doing so, Arion unknowingly fulfilled a prophecy between he, Ocean Master, and Mera, that of which would determine the true king of Atlantis. Arion arose as the victor in the eyes of the Atlanteans much to his dismay as Arion believed himself to be a failure because of Atlantis' sinking.

Film
 Atlantis appears in the films set in the DC Extended Universe:
 Atlantis is featured in Justice League and its director's cut. The Atlanteans assisted the tribes of men, the Amazons, the Olympian Gods, and the Green Lantern Corps in fighting Steppenwolf's army. After the battle, Zeus entrusted one of the Mother Boxes to the Atlanteans for safekeeping.
 Atlantis was featured heavily in Aquaman where there are seven kingdoms that formed after the original Atlantis sank into the ocean: Atlantis, Xebel, the Kingdom of the Trench, the Kingdom of the Brine, the Kingdom of the Fishermen, the Kingdom of the Deserters, and the Kingdom of the Valor. Xebel is a military power that rivals Atlantis. The Trench reside in the deepest part of the ocean. The Kingdom of the Brine consist of crustacean-like humanoids. The Kingdom of the Fishermen is inhabited by fish-like mer-people. The Kingdom of the Deserters died out when the Sahara Desert first became a desert when it was formerly an inland sea. The missing kingdom is an unknown one and it is said to have collapsed along with the Deserter Kingdom. The Ocean Master planned to unite the different kingdoms in his war against the surface world. After winning the favor of Mera's father King Nereus (portrayed by Dolph Lundgren) of Xebel, Ocean Master led him to the Fisherman Kingdom. He killed King Ricou (motion-captured by Andrew Crawford and voiced by Djimon Hounsou) of the Fishermen when he declined and the Ocean Master persuaded his wife Queen Rina (motion-captured by Natalia Safran) and daughter Princess Scales (motion-captured by Sophie Forrest) to take up his offer. When it came to the Brine, its king (motion-captured by Andrew Crawford and voiced by John Rhys-Davies) agreed to lend his army, with him not swearing his allegiance to the Ocean Master. Before the Ocean Master can kill the Brine King, Aquaman arrives with an army of sea creatures, the Trench, and the sea monster Karathen as Mera persuades her father to side with Aquaman. At the end of the film when Aquaman defeats the Ocean Master, Atlantis, Xebel, the Fishermen, and the Brine swear allegiance to their new king.

References

External links
 DCU Guide: Atlantis
 Cosmic Teams: Atlantis
 DCU Guide: Atlantis Chronicles 
 Beek's Books: Atlantis Chronicles 

Aquaman
DC Comics Atlanteans
DC Comics
Classical mythology in DC Comics
1939 in comics
DC Comics locations
Fictional countries
Fictional elements introduced in 1959